Josua Mateinaniu was a preacher and catechist (teacher) in the Methodist Church of Fiji and Rotuma. A wanderer and a sailor at first, he drifted in his travels to Tonga, where he became a Christian.

Life
In 1835, Mateinaniu helped William Cross and David Cargill in their linguistic preparations for the mission to Fiji. He became a preacher and came back to his own land with Cross and Cargill, and was himself a most important factor in the missionary impact made on Lakeba from the start. He went ahead of the first missionaries to Somosomo, and preached there with some success  among the Tongans, who were in the service of Tui Cakau at that time, thus making it possible for Hunt and Lyth, to establish that station.

Of Mateinaniu, Cargill wrote the following in his wife, Margaret's memoirs:

He preached in Bau regularly, long before it was really opened to  white missionaries. At the time of Hunt's death, he was stationed at Viwa; he and his wife personally cared for Hunt's family during the long weeks of that final illness.

One of the four houses at Lelean Memorial School, a Methodist church secondary school located at Davuilevu, Nausori, is named in honour of Mateinaniu.

References
 John Garrett,“To Live Among the Stars”, Institute of Pacific Studies, 1985 (book reviewed in the Journal of Pacific History, Sept, 1998, by Roderic Lacey)
 Tippett, A.R., 1954, The Christian (Fiji 1835–1867), Auckland Institute and Museum, Auckland
 BALEIWAQA, Tevita, 1996, ‘Josua Mateinaniu/Ko Josua Mateinaniu’, in Thornley and Vulaono 1996:20–30.
 Memoirs of Mrs Margaret Cargill : wife of the Rev. David Cargill, A.M., Wesleyan missionary, including notices of the progress of Christianity in Tonga and Feejee / by her husband

Methodist missionaries in Fiji
Fijian Methodist missionaries
Converts to Methodism
People from Lakeba
I-Taukei Fijian Methodist ministers
Year of birth missing
Year of death missing